Sulisobenzone (benzophenone-4) is an ingredient in some sunscreens which protects the skin from damage by UVB and UVA ultraviolet light.

Its sodium salt, sulisobenzone sodium, is also referred to as benzophenone-5.

References

Benzenesulfonic acids
Sunscreening agents
Phenols
Phenol ethers
Benzophenones